Arabella Fermor (1696–1737) was the daughter of a marriage between two recusant Roman Catholic families in Protestant England, the Fermors of Oxfordshire and the Brownes of Berkshire. The family seat was Tusmore House, noted for its formal gardens.

Her beauty was made famous by her starring role in Alexander Pope's famous poem The Rape of the Lock. After her beau Robert Petre brought about the dissolution of their engagement by stealing a lock of her hair (satirically related in the poem), Fermor married Francis Perkins of Ufton Court around 1715. She bore one daughter, Arabella, who died as a child, and five sons.

References 

People from Ufton Nervet
1696 births
1737 deaths